The Blue Ball Inn is a pub in Grantchester, Cambridgeshire, England.

It was rebuilt in 1893, and the layout is intact. It is on the Regional Inventory of Historic Pub Interiors for East Anglia.

References

Pubs in Cambridgeshire
Grantchester